Semperdon uncatus is a species of small, air-breathing land snails, terrestrial pulmonate gastropod mollusks in the family Charopidae. This species is endemic to Palau.

References

Fauna of Palau
Semperdon
Gastropods described in 1982
Taxonomy articles created by Polbot